A League of Their Own is a 1992 American sports comedy-drama film directed by Penny Marshall that tells a fictionalized account of the real-life All-American Girls Professional Baseball League (AAGPBL). The film stars Tom Hanks, Geena Davis, Madonna, Lori Petty, Rosie O'Donnell, Jon Lovitz, David Strathairn, Garry Marshall, and Bill Pullman. The screenplay was written by Lowell Ganz and Babaloo Mandel from a story by Kelly Candaele and Kim Wilson.

A League of Their Own was a critical and commercial success, grossing over $132.4 million worldwide and garnering acclaim for Marshall's direction and the performances of its ensemble cast. In 2012, the film was selected for preservation in the United States National Film Registry by the Library of Congress as being "culturally, historically, or aesthetically significant".

Plot

In 1988, Dottie Hinson attends the opening of the All-American Girls Professional Baseball League exhibit at the Baseball Hall of Fame. She sees many former teammates and friends, prompting a flashback to 1943.

When World War II threatens to shut down Major League Baseball, Chicago Cubs owner Walter Harvey persuades his fellow owners to bankroll a women's league. Ira Lowenstein is put in charge. Scout Ernie Capadino attends an industrial-league softball game in Oregon and likes what he sees in Dottie, the catcher for a local dairy. She is happy with her life while waiting for her husband Bob to return from the war. Her younger sister Kit, however, is desperate to get away and make something of herself. Capadino is unimpressed by Kit's batting and refuses to evaluate her pitching, but agrees to take her along if she changes Dottie's mind. Dottie agrees for her sister's sake.

Dottie and Kit travel to Harvey Field in Chicago for the tryout. They meet taxi dancer Mae "All the Way Mae" Mordabito and her best friend, bouncer Doris Murphy, soft-spoken right fielder Evelyn Gardner, illiterate left fielder Shirley Baker, pitcher/shortstop and former Miss Georgia beauty queen Ellen Sue Gotlander, left field/relief pitcher Betty "Spaghetti" Horn, second baseperson Marla Hooch, first baseperson Helen Haley, and superstitious Alice "Skeeter" Gaspers. They and five others are selected to form the Rockford Peaches, while 48 others make up the Racine Belles, Kenosha Comets, and South Bend Blue Sox.

The Peaches are managed by former star Cubs slugger Jimmy Dugan, a cynical alcoholic. He initially treats the whole thing as a joke, forcing Dottie to take over as on-field leader for much of the early part of the season. Dugan is also abrasive toward his players. The team travels with Evelyn's spoiled bratty son Stillwell and tightly wound team chaperone Miss Cuthburt. With a Life magazine photographer in the stands, Lowenstein begs the players to do something spectacular, as the league has attracted little attention. Dottie obliges, catching a popped-up ball behind home plate while doing a split. The resulting photograph makes the magazine cover. A publicity campaign draws more people to the ballgames, but the owners remain unconvinced.

The teammates bond. Marla marries a man named Nelson whom she met on a raucous roadhouse outing and leaves the team for the rest of the season, Mae teaches Shirley to read, and Evelyn writes a team song. As Dottie is made the face of the league, Kit becomes resentful and their sibling rivalry intensifies, resulting in Kit's trade to the Racine Belles.

The Peaches end the season with the league's best record, qualifying for the World Series. Jimmy gives Betty a telegram informing her that her husband was killed in action in the Pacific Theater. Grief-stricken, she leaves the team. That evening, Dottie receives a surprise when Bob shows up, having been wounded and discharged from the Army. Jimmy discovers that Dottie is going home with Bob. Unable to persuade her to play in the World Series, he tells her she will regret her decision.

The Peaches face the Belles in the World Series, which goes the full seven games. Dottie rejoins the Peaches for the seventh game, while Kit is the starting pitcher for the Belles. With the Belles leading by a run in the top of the ninth, Dottie drives in the go-ahead run. Kit is distraught, but gets a second chance when she comes to bat with two outs in the bottom of the ninth. She gets a hit and ignoring the third base coach's sign to stop, scores the winning run by knocking her sister over at the plate and dislodging the ball from Dottie's hand.

The sellout crowd convinces Harvey to give Lowenstein the owners' support. After the game, the sisters reconcile before Dottie leaves with Bob.

In the present, Dottie is reunited with the other players, including Kit, as well as Capadino and Lowenstein, but she learns from an older Stillwell that Evelyn is dead. Bob and Dugan are revealed to be dead too. The surviving Peaches sing Evelyn's team song and pose for a photo. During the closing credits, they play baseball at Doubleday Field.

Cast

Rockford Peaches

 Tom Hanks as Jimmy Dugan (manager)
 Geena Davis as Dorothy "Dottie" Hinson (#8, catcher/assistant manager)
 Lynn Cartwright as Older Dottie
 Madonna as "All the Way" Mae Mordabito (#5, center field)
 Eunice Anderson as Older Mae
 Lori Petty as Kit Keller (#23, pitcher)
 Kathleen Butler as Older Kit
 Rosie O'Donnell as Doris Murphy (#22, third base)
 Vera Johnson as Older Doris
 Anne Ramsay as Helen Haley (#15, first base)
 Barbara Pilavin as Older Helen
 Megan Cavanagh as Marla Hooch (#32, second base)
 Patricia Wilson as Older Marla
 Freddie Simpson as Ellen Sue Gotlander (#1, shortstop/pitcher)
 Eugenia McLin as Older Ellen Sue
 Tracy Reiner as Betty "Spaghetti" Horn (#7, left field/relief pitcher)
 Betty Miller as Older Betty
 Bitty Schram as Evelyn Gardner (#17, right field)
 Renée Coleman (credited as Renee Coleman) – Alice "Skeeter" Gaspers (#18, left field/center field/catcher)
 Shirley Burkovich as Older Alice
 Ann Cusack as Shirley Baker (#11, left field)
 Barbara Erwin as Older Shirley
 Robin Knight as Linda "Beans" Babbitt (shortstop)
 Patti Pelton as Marbleann Wilkinson (second base)
 Kelli Simpkins as Beverly Dixon (#4, outfield)
 Connie Pounds-Taylor as Connie Calhoun (Outfield)

Others

 Jon Lovitz as Ernie Capadino, AAGPBL scout
 David Strathairn as Ira Lowenstein, AAGPBL general manager
 Marvin Einhorn as Older Ira
 Garry Marshall as Walter Harvey, candy bar mogul and AAGPBL founder (Based on Philip K. Wrigley)
 Julie Croteau as Helen Haley (baseball double for Anne Ramsay)
 Bill Pullman as Bob Hinson, Dottie's husband
 Janet Jones as Racine pitcher
 Téa Leoni as Racine first base
 Don S. Davis as Charlie Collins, Racine manager
 Eddie Jones as Dave Hooch, Marla's father
 Justin Scheller as Stillwell Gardner, Evelyn's son
 Mark Holton as Older Stillwell
 Pauline Brailsford as Miss Cuthburt, Rockford chaperone
 Rae Allen as Ma Keller
 DeLisa Chinn-Tyler in an uncredited role as the Black woman who threw the ball back to Davis in an iconic scene

Production

Development
Director Penny Marshall was inspired to make the film after viewing the 1987 documentary about the AAGPBL titled A League of their Own on television. She had never heard of the league before, and contacted the film's creators, Kelly Candaele and Kim Wilson, to collaborate with the scriptwriters, Babaloo Mandel and Lowell Ganz, on producing a screenplay for 20th Century Fox. Fox eventually passed on the script and Marshall signed with Sony Pictures, who were eager to produce the film.

Casting 
On MLB Network's Costas at the Movies in 2013, director Penny Marshall talked about her initial interest in Demi Moore for the part of Dottie Hinson, saying: "Demi Moore, I liked, but by the time we came around, she was pregnant." Debra Winger was then cast in the role of Dottie and spent three months training with the Chicago Cubs in preparation. However, Winger dropped out of the production four weeks before the start of principal photography. She later publicly stated that the casting of Madonna was the reason for her decision. Geena Davis was selected by Marshall to replace Winger.

USC assistant baseball coach Bill Hughes was the film’s technical adviser and put the film’s ensemble cast through baseball camp three months before filming.

Filming
Principal photography began July 10, 1991. Filming the game scenes involved many physical mishaps: Anne Ramsay (Helen Haley) broke her nose with a baseball mitt while trying to catch a ball and the huge bruise seen in the film on actress Renée Coleman's thigh was real.
Discussing the skirts they wore playing baseball in the film, Geena Davis said on MLB Network's Costas at the Movies in 2013, "Some of our real cast, from sliding into home, had ripped the skin off their legs. It was nutty." In a 2021 interview, Petty claimed to have broken her foot during filming, but reiterated her enjoyment of the shoot and the understanding of the film's importance at the time.

The tryout scene, which took place at a fictional Major League Baseball stadium in Chicago called Harvey Field, was filmed at the Chicago Cubs' home stadium, Wrigley Field, on which the fictitious Harvey Field is based. The Rockford Peaches' home games were filmed at League Stadium in Huntingburg, Indiana, while the championship game against Racine was filmed at Bosse Field in Evansville, Indiana. Additional games were filmed at Jay Littleton Ball Park in Ontario, California. The final week of shooting took place during late October 1991 in Cooperstown, New York, where 65 original AAGPBL members appeared in scenes recreating the induction of the league into the Baseball Hall of Fame in 1988. Due to the length of the schedule, the cast entertained themselves by putting on an elaborate amateur production called "Jesus Christ Superstar Goes Hawaiian."

Soundtrack
A League of Their Own soundtrack was released on CD and cassette tape by Columbia Records on June 30, 1992. The album peaked at #159 on the US Billboard 200 albums chart on July 25, 1992. Although Madonna contributed "This Used to Be My Playground" to the film, featured over the closing credits, her recording was not included on the soundtrack album for contractual reasons.

Reception

Box office
The film was released on July 1, 1992, and grossed $13.2 million in its first weekend, finishing second at the box office behind Batman Returns. In its second weekend it dropped just 15%, making $11.5 million and finishing first. It ended up being a commercial success, making $107.5 million in the United States and Canada, but only $24.9 million in other territories, for a worldwide total of $132.4 million, against a production budget of $40 million.

Critical response
The film was well received by critics, who praised the cast and their performances.
On review aggregator Rotten Tomatoes, the film holds an approval rating of 81% based on 79 reviews with an average score of 7/10. The website's critical consensus reads, "Sentimental and light, but still thoroughly charming, A League of Their Own is buoyed by solid performances from a wonderful cast." On Metacritic, the film received a weighted average score of 69 based 21 reviews, indicating "generally favorable reviews". Audiences polled by CinemaScore gave the film an average grade of "A−" on an A+ to F scale.

Vincent Canby of The New York Times wrote: "Though big of budget, A League of Their Own is one of the year's most cheerful, most relaxed, most easily enjoyable comedies. It's a serious film that's lighter than air, a very funny movie that manages to score a few points for feminism in passing."
Roger Ebert of the Chicago Sun-Times gave it 3 out of 4 stars and wrote: "The movie has a real bittersweet charm. The baseball sequences, we've seen before. What's fresh are the personalities of the players, the gradual unfolding of their coach and the way this early chapter of women's liberation fit into the hidebound traditions of professional baseball."

Accolades
On December 19, 2012, it was announced that the film would be preserved as part of the United States National Film Registry.

Jimmy Dugan's (Tom Hanks) remark addressed to Evelyn Gardner (Bitty Schram), "There's no crying in baseball!", was ranked 54th on the American Film Institute's 2005 list AFI's 100 Years...100 Movie Quotes.

20th anniversary Blu-ray edition
With 2012 marking the 20th year since the film's release, A League of Their Own was released as a 20th Anniversary Edition Blu-ray on October 16, 2012.

Forty-seven former players of the AAGPBL reunited in New York to celebrate the film and the real women who inspired it. Events included a trip to Cooperstown for a special program at the National Baseball Hall of Fame, reminiscent of the film's final scene depicting members of the AAGPBL and family coming together to honor the Women's Professional Baseball League. The reunion wrapped up with a game of softball held at Alliance Bank Stadium in nearby Syracuse.

Former players also made an appearance at Bosse Field in Evansville, Indiana, on June 6, 2012, where many of the film's game scenes were filmed. Bosse Field still retains many of the "Racine Belles" themes from the movie. The event included an outdoor screening of the film as well as a scene-setting display of cars featured in the film. In addition to Bosse Field, the production used Huntingburg, Indiana's League Stadium, another Southwestern Indiana field older than Bosse that was renovated for the film.

Spinoffs
A short-lived series of the same title based on the film aired on CBS in April 1993, with Garry Marshall, Megan Cavanagh, Tracy Reiner, Freddie Simpson, and Jon Lovitz reprising their roles. Carey Lowell took over Geena Davis's role. Only five of the six episodes made were broadcast.

On August 6, 2020, Amazon Video gave a series order to reboot the series.

See also

 Women in baseball

References

External links

 
 
 
 
 ESPN.com – Page 2 – Reel Life: 'A League of Their Own'

1992 films
1990s sports comedy-drama films
All-American Girls Professional Baseball League
American baseball films
American sports comedy-drama films
Columbia Pictures films
1990s English-language films
1990s feminist films
Films about women's sports
Films adapted into television shows
Films directed by Penny Marshall
Films produced by Robert Greenhut
Films scored by Hans Zimmer
Films set in 1943
Films set in 1988
Films set in Chicago
Films set in Colorado
Films set in Illinois
Films set in Indiana
Films set in New York (state)
Films set in Oregon
Films set in Wisconsin
Films set on the home front during World War II
Films with screenplays by Babaloo Mandel
Films with screenplays by Lowell Ganz
Sports films based on actual events
United States National Film Registry films
Films about sisters
American female buddy films
1990s female buddy films
Women's baseball
1990s American films